URAN (Ukrainian Radio Interferometer of NASU) (Ukrainian: Український Радіоіонтеферометр Академії Наук - УРАН) is an array of radio-telescopes, spread across Ukraine and used for long-baseline interferometry in the 8-40 MHz range.  The most sensitive of the telescopes is UTR-2; URAN-1 (built in 1975 in Zmiiv (Kharkiv oblast) ) and URAN-2 (construction started in 1979 in Stepanivka village near Poltava), URAN-3 is near Shatsk, in the north-west corner of Ukraine by the point where Poland and Belarus meet Ukraine, and URAN-4 (built in 1975) is in the south-west, a little west of Odessa and by the Moldovan border.

Auxiliary telescopes are URAN-1 has 96 dipoles in a 178 x 28m array; URAN-2 has 512 in a 238 x 118m; URAN-3 has 256 in a 238 x 58m; URAN-4 has 128 in 238 x 28m.  Because of the small number of baselines, images from URAN tend to be produced by model-fitting to sums of Gaussians rather than by direct synthesis.

References

Most of the information in this article comes from Valeriy Shepelev's presentation http://www.lofar.org/workshop/26Apr07_Thursday03/LOFARWorkshop_Apr07_ValeriyShepelev.pdf at an April 2007 LOFAR workshop.

Further reading

Radio telescopes
Astronomical observatories in Ukraine